The Midnight Venus is a 1951 West German comedy film directed by Ferdinand Dörfler and starring Theo Lingen, Paul Kemp and Maria Andergast.

Cast
 Theo Lingen as Meister Anton
 Paul Kemp as Hansl
 Maria Andergast as Frau Anna
 Hans Schwarz Jr. as Reitersepp
 Hubert von Meyerinck as Director Meyer
 Fita Benkhoff as Madame Lavable
 Hella Lexington as Miss Spleen
 Guenther R. Ewers as von Kitschampur
 Lotte Stein as van der Gould
 Lotte Lang as Marei

References

Bibliography
 Hans-Michael Bock and Tim Bergfelder. The Concise Cinegraph: An Encyclopedia of German Cinema. Berghahn Books, 2009.

External links 
 

1951 films
German comedy films
1951 comedy films
West German films
1950s German-language films
Films directed by Ferdinand Dörfler
Films about fashion designers
German black-and-white films
1950s German films